Arnoldsweiler is a village in Nordrhein-Westfalen, Germany. It is part of the town Düren, situated between Cologne and Aachen. Its population was 3,185 in 2017.

History
The village is named after the late 8th century AD Saint Arnold of Arnoldsweiler, a charitable Greek musician at the court of Charlemagne.

References

Villages in North Rhine-Westphalia
Düren (district)